The 1980–81 SM-liiga season was the sixth season of the SM-liiga, the top level of ice hockey in Finland. 10 teams participated in the league, and Kärpät Oulu won the championship.

Standings

Playoffs

Quarterfinal
 Kärpät - Ilves 2:0 (5:1, 5:2)
 Ässät - HIFK 0:2 (2:6, 4:7)

Semifinal
 Tappara - HIFK 3:0 (4:2, 9:3, 11:0)
 TPS - Kärpät 2:3 (2:4, 9:5, 6:2, 0:6, 2:3 P)

3rd place
 TPS - HIFK 2:0 (4:3 P, 7:6)

Final
 Tappara - Kärpät 2:3 (5:2, 1:6, 13:2, 1:6, 2:5)

Relegation

External links
 SM-liiga official website

1980–81 in Finnish ice hockey
Fin
Liiga seasons